Le Muretain Agglo is the communauté d'agglomération, an intercommunal structure, centred on the city of Muret. It is located in the Haute-Garonne department, in the Occitanie region, southern France. It was created in January 2017. Its seat is in Muret. Its area is 319.8 km2. Its population was 120,348 in 2017, of which 24,945 in Muret proper.

Composition
The communauté d'agglomération consists of the following 26 communes:

Bonrepos-sur-Aussonnelle
Bragayrac
Eaunes
Empeaux
Le Fauga
Fonsorbes
Frouzins
Labarthe-sur-Lèze
Labastidette
Lamasquère
Lavernose-Lacasse
Muret
Pinsaguel
Pins-Justaret
Portet-sur-Garonne
Roques
Roquettes
Sabonnères
Saiguède
Saint-Clar-de-Rivière
Saint-Hilaire
Saint-Lys
Saint-Thomas
Saubens
Seysses
Villate

References

Agglomeration communities in France
Intercommunalities of Haute-Garonne